Edward Lloyd "Sonny" Kryzanowski (November 14, 1925 – April 29, 2007) was a Canadian ice hockey player who played 237 games in the National Hockey League with the Boston Bruins and Chicago Black Hawks between 1948 and 1953.

Career statistics

Regular season and playoffs

External links 
 

1925 births
2007 deaths
Boston Bruins players
Canadian ice hockey defencemen
Chicago Blackhawks players
Hershey Bears players
Ice hockey people from Ontario
Sportspeople from Fort Frances
Providence Reds players
Toronto Varsity Blues ice hockey players